Marlbrook is an unincorporated community in Rockbridge County, Virginia, United States. It sits at an elevation of 1204 feet (367 m).

References

Unincorporated communities in Rockbridge County, Virginia
Unincorporated communities in Virginia